Dave Scherer, better known by his stage name Agape, is an American rapper and musician. He has been touring full-time since 2000, performing in the United States and in six other countries. He has recorded six CDs, including Many Rooms with producer Ant (Atmosphere, Brother Ali). On his recent CD Rise Up he worked with Chris Brown's producer Ra Charm as well as Grammy-award-winning singer Billy Steele (Sounds of Blackness, The Steeles).  He has performed in front of Archbishop Desmond Tutu, Toby Mac, David Crowder, Tony Campolo, and gospel singer Kirk Franklin. In 2001, he co-founded "JUMP" (Joint Urban Ministries in Praise), a ministry dedicated to helping urban youth unleash their leadership skills through the arts.  In 2009, he received the Tom Hunstad Award for excellence in youth ministry and his contribution to the lives of young people.

Career highlights

 Has sold over 30,000 CDs independently
 Performed for 40,000 youth at the New Orleans Superdome in 2009,2012,2015 and 2018 for the ELCA Youth Gathering
 Toured extensively in Bosnia on a mission of hope and reconciliation
 Helped launch AMP (All-Metro Praise) in 2012, a service designed to bring together young people of all backgrounds
 2009 "Jesus, Justice, Jazz" tour raised money (over $50,000) and awareness for world hunger.
 Won 2009 Tom Hunstad award for youth ministry (previous winners include Mike Yaconelli and Rollie Martinson)
 Single "Keepin It Tight" was peaked at number 3 on mp3.com chart
 Performer at National Youth Gatherings of UMC, ELCA, Community of Christ and LCMS, Lutheran Brethren
 Speaker at National Youthworkers Convention in Atlanta, Georgia and Western States Gathering in Seattle, Washington
 Facilitator of Leadership Development Intensive Training
 Chairman of Building Bridges Conference for Diversity
 Co-leader of Fellowship of Christian Athletes
 Youth director at Mt. Olivet Lutheran Church in Minneapolis, Minnesota
 Artist in residence at Ramsey Fine Arts School in Minneapolis, Minnesota
 Teacher at Urban Academy in Minneapolis, Minnesota
 Mentor at First Lutheran Church in St. Peter, Minnesota
 Member of an award-winning peer education group
 President of Multicultural Student Union
 Co-founder of JUMP ministries (Joint Urban Ministries in Praise)
 Founder of Hip Hop Outreach
 Recipient of the Tom Hunstad award for excellence in youth ministry

Concerts
2014: MSYG (Middle School Youth Gathering) Colorado Springs
2009: ELCA Youth Gathering in New Orleans
2012: ELCA Youth Gathering in New Orleans
2015: ELCA Detroit Youth Gathering where approximately 30,000 youth attended

Discography

Albums

Music Videos
"All Are Welcome"

References

External links 
 Official Website
 Youth 2011 Hip-hop Artist 'Agape' Brings Concert to Manteca in March
 AGAPE Adds FUMC Santa Rosa on March 4 to Cal-Nevada Tour
 Youth 2011 Artist Lineup

 

American male rappers
Rappers from Minneapolis
21st-century American rappers
21st-century American male musicians
Living people
Year of birth missing (living people)